The Portland Formation is a geological formation in Connecticut and Massachusetts in the northeastern United States. It dates back to the Early Jurassic period. The formation consists mainly of sandstone laid down by a series of lakes (in the older half of the formation) and the floodplain of a river (in the younger half).

In 2016, the paleontologist Robert E. Weems and colleagues suggested the Portland Formation should be elevated to a geological group within the Newark Supergroup (as the Portland Group), and thereby replacing the former name "Agawam Group". They also reinstated the Longmeadow Sandstone as a formation (within the uppermost Portland Group); it had earlier been considered identical to the Portland Formation.

Vertebrate paleofauna
Dinosaur coprolites are located in Massachusetts, USA. Ornithischian tracks, Theropod tracks and Prosauropod tracks are located in Massachusetts and Connecticut, USA.

See also 
 List of dinosaur-bearing rock formations

References

Bibliography 
 

Geologic formations of the United States
Jurassic Connecticut
Jurassic Massachusetts
Early Jurassic North America
Jurassic System of North America
Sandstone formations of the United States
Ichnofossiliferous formations